Michurin (masculine) or Michurina (feminine) may refer to:

People
Ivan Fyodorovich Michurin (1700–1763), Russian architect
Ivan Vladimirovich Michurin (1855–1935), Soviet plant breeder
Olga Michurina, Russian runner who set a world record at the 10,000 meter women indoor event

Places
Michurina (rural locality), name of several rural localities in Russia

Other
Michurin (film) (1948), a Soviet film about the plant breeder